Bir Durjoy (Bengali: বীর দুর্জয়) is the forth highest peacetime gallantry award of Bangladesh.

References 

Military awards and decorations of Bangladesh